Liu Yutong (born 5 March 2004) is a Chinese para badminton player. She won gold in para-badminton at the 2020 Summer Paralympics in the women's singles WH2 event. She also won silver in the women's doubles WH1–WH2 event with her partner Yin Menglu.

Personal life 
Liu was born in Cangzhou. In 2009, Liu was involved in a traffic accident which caused her to lose both of her legs. In 2016, she was drafted to the Chinese national wheelchair badminton team.

Achievements

Paralympic Games 
Women's singles WH2

Women's doubles WH1–WH2

World Championships 
Women's singles

Women's doubles

Asian Para Games 

Women's singles

Women's doubles

Mixed doubles

Asian Championships 
Women's singles

Asian Youth Para Games 
Women's singles

International Tournaments (9 titles, 1 runner-up) 
Women's singles

Women's doubles

Mixed doubles

References

Notes 

2004 births
Living people
People from Cangzhou
Chinese female badminton players
Paralympic badminton players of China
Paralympic gold medalists for China
Paralympic silver medalists for China
Paralympic medalists in badminton
Medalists at the 2020 Summer Paralympics
Badminton players at the 2020 Summer Paralympics
Chinese para-badminton players
21st-century Chinese women